The 2008–09 Nemzeti Bajnokság II was Hungary's the 58th season of the Nemzeti Bajnokság II, the second tier of the Hungarian football league system.

League table

Western group

Eastern group

See also
 2008–09 Magyar Kupa
 2008–09 Nemzeti Bajnokság I
 2008–09 Nemzeti Bajnokság III

References

External links
  
  

Nemzeti Bajnokság II seasons
2008–09 in Hungarian football
Hun